Guarea cartaguenya is a species of plant in the family Meliaceae. It is found in Colombia and Ecuador.

References

cartaguenya
Vulnerable plants
Flora of Colombia
Flora of Ecuador
Taxonomy articles created by Polbot